The 2000 D.C. United season was the club's sixth year of existence, as well as their fifth season in Major League Soccer.

Upon winning the 1999 MLS Cup final, United were unable to not only defend their league title, but the club failed to qualify for the MLS Cup Playoffs. This was the first time in MLS history the defending MLS Cup champion failed to qualify for the MLS Cup Playoffs the subsequent season, a feat that would not be accomplished again until the Portland Timbers did so in 2016.

In continental play, United played in the 2000 CONCACAF Champions' Cup, which was held months before the actual season began, a possible reason for United's poor league play, along with salary cap restrictions. United finished fourth in the tournament, at first beating Central American runners-up Alajuelense 2–1 in the quarterfinals. In the semis, the Los Angeles Galaxy got revenge on United in a penalty kick shootout following a 1–1 regulation time draw. Consequently, United played Toluca for third place and lost 2–1.

Background

Review

June 
D.C. United beat Charleston Battery 4–0 to open the USOC.

July 

Returning to USOC play in the third round proper, United shut out the Rochester Raging Rhinos, 3–0.

August 

Entering the USOC semis, the Black and Red played their first MLS opponent in the tournament, the Miami Fusion. United lost 3–2 in extra time.

Match results

MLS

CONCACAF Champion's Cup

U.S. Open Cup

League standings

Division 

Source: MLSSoccer.com
Rules for classification: 1st points; 2nd head-to-head record; 3rd goal difference; 4th number of goals scored.
(SS) = MLS Supporters' Shield; (E1) = Eastern Division champion
Only applicable when the season is not finished:
(Q) = Qualified for the MLS Cup Playoffs, but not yet to the particular round indicated; (E) = Eliminated from playoff-contention.

Overall 

Source: MLSSoccer.com
Rules for classification: 1st points; 2nd head-to-head record; 3rd goal difference; 4th number of goals scored.
(SS) = MLS Supporters' Shield; (E1) = Eastern Division champion, (C1) = Central Division champion, (W1) = Western Division champion
Only applicable when the season is not finished:
(Q) = Qualified for the MLS Cup Playoffs, but not yet to the particular round indicated; (E) = Eliminated from playoff-contention.

Player details

Transfers

In

Out

References 

2000
Dc United
Dc United
2000 in sports in Washington, D.C.